Time to Think: The Inside Story of the Collapse of the Tavistock's Gender Service for Children is a 2023 nonfiction book by Newsnight investigative journalist Hannah Barnes. The book is about the NHS Gender Identity Development Service (GIDS) based at the Tavistock and Portman NHS Foundation Trust. Barnes said, "I wanted to write a definitive record of what happened [at GIDS] because there needs to be one."

Publication
Barnes sent the book proposal to 22 publishers. Several publishers praised the proposal, but declined to publish it; one of them on the basis that it was too controversial. On 13th April 2021, the independent publisher Swift Press made Barnes an offer.

Synopsis
The book is centred around Barnes' over 100 hours of interviews with close to 60 former clinicians who worked at GIDS. All but 2 of the interviews were taken before the decision was made to close GIDS.

Time to Think traces the history of GIDS from its foundation in 1989, covering the evolving nature of their services, the usage of puberty blockers, the influence of charities and support groups Mermaids, GIRES (Gender Identity Research and Education Society), and Gendered Intelligence, and the limited collaboration with CAMHS.

It traces various reports made by clinicians raising concerns: the David Taylor review (2005), David Bell report (2018), Dinesh Sinha's GIDS review (2019), Helen Roberts report (2021), and Hilary Cass review (2022).

The history is interspersed with accounts of 7 young people who were treated by the service: Ellie, Phoebe, Jack, Hannah, Alex, Jacob and Harriet.

Reception
Barnes' journalism has received praise. Camilla Cavendish of the Financial Times called the book "meticulously researched", as did Janice Turner of The Times. Suzanne Moore from The Daily Telegraph called it "a forensically researched account". Will Lloyd of the New Statesman called it "as scrupulous as journalism can be". Rachel Cooke from The Guardian called her work "scrupulous and fair-minded". Cordelia Fine describes the book as an "exhaustively researched account" of "a textbook organizational scandal".

Katy Hayes of the Irish Independent called it "meticulously academic, thoroughly footnoted and referenced" and "well-argued". However, she also felt it was "one-sided", giving more weight to harm caused than help, and "the overall tone of the book is so hostile that it is likely to become another weapon in the unfortunately loud and bitter war over this subject." Hayes was disappointed that certain phrasings about funding and pay appeared suggestive "that staff were on a sort of cushy number", and noted her own personal experience with GIDS in the mid-2010s was very different and more positive.

References

2023 non-fiction books
English-language books
Investigative journalism
Medical scandals
Transgender non-fiction books